Sudoverf is a rural locality (a village) in Borovetskoye Rural Settlement, Sokolsky District, Vologda Oblast, Russia. The population was 48 as of 2002.

Geography 
Sudoverf is located 21 km northwest of Sokol (the district's administrative centre) by road. Kapustino is the nearest rural locality.

References 

Rural localities in Sokolsky District, Vologda Oblast